Philip II (1195–1226), called à la lèvre, was the Marquis of Namur from 1216 to his death. He was the eldest son of Peter II of Courtenay and Yolanda of Flanders. On the death of his maternal uncle Philip the Noble in 1212, his mother Yolanda temporarily ruled Namur and passed the county to Philip in 1216.

His father Peter was chosen as Latin Emperor of Constantinople in 1216 and when he died in 1217, Philip refused to rule the empire when it was offered to him. The Constantinople empire went to his brother Robert.

Philip had to fight the descendants of Henry IV of Luxembourg (as Henry I of Namur) who had not given up their claim to Namur. He fought Waleran III of Limburg, husband of Ermesinda of Luxembourg, and concluded peace in March 1223 at Dinant.

In 1226, he partook in the Albigensian Crusade of Louis VIII of France and the siege of Avignon. Philip died near Saint-Flour in the Auvergne. He was unmarried and the margraviate went to his brother Henry.

References

Sources

294

1195 births
1226 deaths
Capetian House of Courtenay
Margraves of Namur
People of the Albigensian Crusade
Sons of emperors